The Viña del Mar International Song Festival 2010 was held from February 22, 2010 until Saturday February 27, 2010. The musical event was broadcast on Chilean TV channels Televisión Nacional de Chile and Canal 13, and will be held in Viña del Mar, Chile, like the past 50 editions. The show is hosted for the second time by Soledad Onetto and Felipe Camiroaga. For the first time the whole event was broadcast in HD (High Definition) via Canal 13.

The last day on February 27, 2010 of the festival was canceled due to the 2010 Chile earthquake.

Background
For the first time, the people participated in the choice of the song that represents Chile in the international competition via text message which chose 5 songs. In a ceremony on November 28, 2009, a judges chose the finalist, which was "El Tiempo en La Bastillas" by Difuntos Correa, originally performed by Fernando Ubiergo, the song received 18,32% of the people votes.

The Organization of the event began in mid-2009 with initial discussions with producers, among the first artists that were proposed included, Shakira, Makano, Julio Iglesias, Myriam Hernández. During November 2009, artists such as Beyoncé, Miley Cyrus, Jonas Brothers, Tina Turner, Ashley Tisdale, Alicia Keys, Alejandro Sanz and Maná were named as possible in the event.

Canadian singer Paul Anka, Latin Grammy-winning Mexican band Reik, Chilean tropical sensation Américo y La Nueva Alegría, reggaeton performer Tito El Bambino and the humorist Coco Legrand were the first artists confirmed to attend the 51st edition of the festival. On December 3, 2009, three new acts were confirmed for the main show, Ricardo Arjona, Spanish singer Raphael, Argentine electropop band Miranda!, Latin Grammy Award-nominated Reggaetón singer Don Omar, humorist Bombo Fica and part of the judges the ex-RBD, Anahí and La Ley former Beto Cuevas. On December 4, 2009, Los Fabulosos Cadillacs and La Noche were confirmed to perform at the show, and La Noche's leader Leo Rey, Los Nocheros' member Jorge Rojas for judges in the international and folklore competition respectively, along with the Colombian pop revelation Fanny Lu.

On December 8, 2009, several rumors of possible participation of the Grammy-nominated American singer Katy Perry on the show were commented by the press, her presence was to be part of the international judgers and in the main show, but it was denied. On December 15, 2009 defined the order of the first artists confirmed, which were distributed in six nights. Controversy caused that Peru was excluded of the folk competence, especially for the last difficulties in the Chile-Peru relations in 2009. Finally on December 17, 2009, the problem was fixed and Peru gets a space in the international competition, but not in the folk competition, because was just included countries that during 2010 celebrates their bicentennial of independence.

Chilean humorist Coco Legrand extraordinaire was awarded with two gold torches for the first time in the history of the festival. The queen of the festival was chosen the Chilean actresses Carolina Arregui, representing the international jury and Canal 13, was elected by 94 votes of the press and the runner-up model Carla Ochoa who was second by 93 votes. Américo was special awarded by the public with 2 silver seagulls and was elected as King of the festival, in second place Beto Cuevas.

Argentina won the folk competition with the song "El Cantar es Andar" interpreted by Canto 4.

Performers
 Américo y La Nueva Alegría
 Anahí
 Bombo Fica
 Coco Legrand
 Don Omar
 La Noche
 Miranda!
 Paul Anka
 Raphael
 Reik
 Ricardo Arjona
 Tito El Bambino

Canceled 2010 Chile earthquake Artist
 Los Fabulosos Cadillacs
 Beto Cuevas
 Los Jaivas

Judges

International competition
 Anahí
 Beto Cuevas
 Fanny Lu
 Leo Rey
 Rafael Araneda
 Carolina Arregui
 Gabriela Vergara

Notes
 Anahí and Fanny Lu performed live during the main show, Beto Cuevas' performance was cancelled due to the earthquake.

Folk competition
 Jorge Rojas
 Yolanda Rayo
 Verónica Franco
 Patricia López
 Sigrid Alegría

Chronology

Participants

International competition

Notes
 indicates the winner.
 indicates the Top 3 classified to the final
 indicates the Top 5 classified to the semifinal.

Chilean international song selection
{| class="wikitable"
! Song
! Artist
! Original performer
! Percentage
|- 
 "El Tiempo en las Bastillas" 
 Difuntos Correa 
 Fernando Ubiergo 
 18,32% 
|- 
|bgcolor=#FDD700| "La Novia"
|bgcolor=#FDD700| Alma
|bgcolor=#FDD700| Antonio Prieto
|bgcolor=#FDD700| 9,38%
|- 
| "El Rock del Mundial"
| Jazzimodo
| Los Ramblers
| 
|- 
| "Todos Juntos"
| Sabina Odone
| Los Jaivas
| 
|- 
|bgcolor=#FDD700| "La Voz de los 80s"
|bgcolor=#FDD700| Inestable
|bgcolor=#FDD700| Los Prisioneros
|bgcolor=#FDD700| 8,47%
|- 
| "Los Momentos"
| K-Reena
| Eduardo Gatti
| 
|- 
|bgcolor=#FDD700| "Tu Cariño se me Va"
|bgcolor=#FDD700| Eric
|bgcolor=#FDD700| Buddy Richard
|bgcolor=#FDD700| 8,60%
|- 
| "Gracias a la Vida"
| Nicole Natalino
| Violeta Parra
| 
|- 
|bgcolor=#FDD700| "Que Cante la Vida"
|bgcolor=#FDD700| Aldo Bustos
|bgcolor=#FDD700| Alberto Plaza
|bgcolor=#FDD700| 24,44%
|- 
| "En Mejillones Yo Tuve un Amor"
| Las Capitalinas
| Fernando Trujillo
| 
|-
|}

Notes
 indicates the winner.
 indicates the Top 5 by votes.
"Que Cante la Vida" won by people votes but the judges chose "El Tiempo en las Bastillas" as the winning song.

Folk competition
{| class="wikitable"
! Country
! Song
! Artist
! Composer
|- 
  Argentina
 "El Cantar es Andar"
 Canto 4
 César Isella
|- 
|bgcolor=#FDD700|  Mexico
|bgcolor=#FDD700| "Traje de Charro"
|bgcolor=#FDD700| Mauro Calderón 
|bgcolor=#FDD700| Ramón de la Cruz García
|- 
|bgcolor=#FDD700|  Chile
|bgcolor=#FDD700| "Chinchinerito"
|bgcolor=#FDD700| Arrabaleros
|bgcolor=#FDD700| Daniel Cantillana, David Azán|- 
|-
|  Bolivia
| "Miscky Simy"
| Qolke Thikas
| Oscar Castro
|- 
|  Colombia
| "La Hamaca"
| Micaela
| María Alejandra Hoyos
|- 
|  Venezuela
| "Vals Gitano"
| María Alejandra Rodríguez
| Pablo Gil
|-
|}

Notes
 indicates the winner.
 indicates the Top 3 classified to the second and final run.

Festival's queen election

References

External links
Official website (Spanish)

Viña del Mar International Song Festival by year
Vina Del Mar International Song Festival, 2010
2010 festivals in Chile
February 2010 events in South America